Majaal ( Audacity) is a 1987 Indian Hindi-language drama film, produced by Srikanth Nahata under the Vijayalakshmi Pictures banner and directed by K. Bapaiah. The film stars Jeetendra, Sridevi, Jaya Prada and has music composed by Bappi Lahiri. It is a remake of the Telugu film Sravana Sandhya (1986) which itself was remade from Tamil film Pournami Alaigal.

Plot 
Vijay Kumar (Jeetendra) is a vibrant guy rose by his uncle advocate Chaudhary Kailashnath (Kader Khan) who studies law. However, Kailashnath crushes his zeal to practice feeling inadequate. Vijay loves Sadhana (Sridevi), a haughty daughter of Kailashnath, and gets married. Sadhana also completes LLB, puts up a nice file, and soon gets promoted as a government lawyer. However, she fails to respect her husband, and further scorns and humiliates him. Suddenly a terrible event, a woman Sravani (Jaya Prada) kills a most respectable top-tier Amrit Lal (Prem Chopra) and surrenders in public. Just then, a priest Vishnu Prasad (Shreeram Lagoo) approaches Kailashnath to defend the case which he denies. Thus, Vijay takes up it as a challenge to prove himself self-sufficient when he discords with Sadhana and quits the house.

The sessions begin when Vijay gives a tough fight to Sadhana and also starts his investigation. In tandem, Rakesh (Raj Kiran) husband of Sravani affirms divorce which dismays her. During that plight, Vijay consoles her when Sadhana suspects their relationship. Moreover, she too receives disgrace from society. Ongoing, vigorous arguments continue when Vijay brings out the demonic shade of Amrit Lal. In the past, Amrit Lal is a temple trustee whereas Sravani’s father Somnath is a priest. One night, Amrit Lal sacrileges the jewelry of God by killing Somnath and also molests his wife (Prem Narayan). The incident makes a severe impact on Sravani who is flaring up for vengeance. Listening to it, the courts acquit her as guiltless. Sadhana is unable to take the defeat and freaks out. Besides, she is aware of Vijay & Sravani's wedlock and rushes. At once, she spots Sravani dedicating herself to the welfare of orphans when Sadhana understands the virtue of her husband. At last, Sadhana pleads for pardon from Vijay. Finally, the movie ends on a happy note as Vijay & Sadhana begin a new life.

Cast 

 Jeetendra as Vijay Kumar
 Sridevi as Sadhana
 Jaya Prada as Sandhya
 Prem Chopra as Amritlal
 Kader Khan as Advocate Kailashnath Chaudhary
 Raj Kiran as Rakesh
 Raza Murad as Sunil Kapoor
 Sadashiv Amrapurkar as Shyamu
 Mehmood as Shrichand Titarmare
 Asrani as Doodhnath
 Satyendra Kapoor as Judge
 Shreeram Lagoo as  Pujari Vishnu Prasad
 Anjana Mumtaz as Sharda 
 Vikas Anand as Inspector Ishwarlal
 Yunus Parvez as Inspector Khanna

Soundtrack 
Lyrics: Indeevar

External links 

1980s Hindi-language films
1987 films
Films directed by K. Bapayya
Films scored by Bappi Lahiri
Hindi remakes of Tamil films